The Demoiselle Stakes is a stakes race for thoroughbred horses open to two-year-old fillies who are willing to race the one and one-eighth miles on dirt.  The Grade II event is run at Aqueduct Racetrack every November for a current purse of $250,000.

The Demoiselle is part of the Road to the Kentucky Oaks, a points system developed by Churchill Downs to determine eligibility for the Kentucky Oaks. The Demoiselle is one of the most important races for juvenile fillies, rivalling the Spinaway Stakes, the Oak Leaf Stakes and the Breeders' Cup Juvenile Fillies in establishing the early favorite for the Oaks.

The Demoiselle, named for the French word for young woman, was run at Empire City Race Track at its inauguration in 1908, then in 1910, 1914, and from 1917 to 1942.  It then moved to Jamaica Racetrack from 1943 to 1953 and from there to Aqueduct. Since inception, the Demoiselle Stakes has been contested at various distances:
 5.5 furlongs: 1908–1936
 5.75 furlongs: 1936–1942
 6 furlongs: 1943–1947
 7 furlongs: 1958–1959
 8.5 furlongs: 1948–1953
 8 furlongs: 1963–1974
 9 furlongs: 1975–present

Records
Speed record: (at current distance of  miles)
 1:50.00 – Plankton (1978) (time measured in fifths of a second)
 1:50.17 – Boca Grande (2006)

Most wins by a jockey:
 5 – Ángel Cordero Jr. (1970, 1980, 1981, 1987, 1988)

Most wins by a trainer:
 8 – Todd A. Pletcher (2001, 2003, 2011, 2012, 2013, 2020, 2021, 2022)

Most wins by an owner:
 4 – Harry Payne Whitney (1919, 1922, 1924, 1926)
 4 – Cornelius V. Whitney (1932, 1941, 1947, 1970)
 4 – Wheatley Stable (1942, 1944, 1959, 1964)

Winners

† In 1998, Tutorial finished first but was disqualified and placed fifth.

See also
Road to the Kentucky Oaks

References
Demoiselle Stakes at the NYRA
The 2008 Demoiselle Stakes at the NTRA

Horse races in New York City
Aqueduct Racetrack
Flat horse races for two-year-old fillies
Graded stakes races in the United States
Grade 2 stakes races in the United States
Recurring sporting events established in 1908
Jamaica Race Course
1908 establishments in New York (state)